Natouch Siripongthon(in ), also known as Fluke, is a Thai actor. He is best known for his roles in Grean Fictions (2013), My Bromance (2014), and Until We Meet Again (TV series) (2019).

Early life and education 
Natouch Siripongthon was born on June 1, 1996. He graduated from Dhurakij Pundit University with a Bachelor's Degree in the Faculty of Arts. He is currently studying for a Master's degree at Chulalongkorn University.

Career 
His first major film was Grean Fictions, released in 2013 and shot in Chiang Mai—the film was cast with young actors of the region. He was noted for his performance in Grean Fictions, which landed him the starring role in the film My Bromance in 2014, where he plays a young man who falls in love with his new stepfather's son. With the positive reception of the film, Fluke became one of the young Thai actors better known abroad. In 2015, Fluke starred in Tanwarin Sukkhapisit's film Red Wine In The Dark Night as an innocent young man who encounters an amnesiac vampire. His latest performance has been as Pharm in Until We Meet Again (TV series),  released in 2019, where he plays a reborn man who committed suicide together with his male lover due to love rejection from his lover's parents. This is based on the book, The Red Thread by Lazy Sheep.

Filmography

Films

Television

Master of Ceremony: MC

Discography

Awards and nominations

References

External links
 
 
https://tv.line.me/keyword/Until%20we%20meet%20again 
https://www.gagaoolala.com/en/videos/1983/my-bromance-two-five-years-later-2020-e01
https://www.goodreads.com/book/show/52002983-red-thread-until-we-meet-again

1996 births
Living people
Natouch Siripongthon
Natouch Siripongthon
Natouch Siripongthon
Natouch Siripongthon
Natouch Siripongthon